Ceremony for the 2nd Hundred Flowers Awards was held in 1963, Beijing.

Awards

Best Film

Best Director

Best Screenplay

Best Actor

Best Actress

Best Supporting Actor

Best Animation

Best Chinese Opera Film

External links
China.com.cn
2nd Hundred Flowers Awards Winners List

1963